Pernille Weiss (born 12 March 1968) is a Danish politician, and businesswoman who was elected as a Conservative People's Party (part of the EPP Group) Member of the European Parliament (MEP) in the 2019 European parliamentary election in Denmark. She is the chief executive officer (CEO) of Archimed, a healthcare and architectural consultancy.

Early life and career
Pernille Weiss was born on 12 March 1968 in Gamborg, Middelfart. Weiss grew up in Funen. Her early education was at the Middelfart Gymnasium. Weiss joined the Conservative People's Party at the age of 15. She qualified as a nurse in 1992 from the Odense School of Nursing in Funen and later specialised in forensic nursing. From 1996 to 2004 she was a member of the Funen County Council. Weiss obtained a Cand.scient. in Health Sciences from the University of Southern Denmark in 2004.

Four years later, Weiss gained a master's degree in Leadership and Innovation from Copenhagen Business School. In the same year, she founded Archimed, a healthcare, and architectural consultancy. She is its chief executive officer (CEO). Weiss had previously worked for consulting firm COWI, and architectural firm Arkitema. In 2017, she became a certified sexologist.

European Parliament
Weiss stood as a candidate in the 2019 European parliamentary election for the Conservative People's Party. She was first on her party's list. Weiss was elected as its sole MEP in Denmark. In the European Parliament, she is part of the EPP group. She serves on the Committee on Industry, Research, and Energy. 

In addition to her committee assignments, Weiss is part of the delegation to the ACP–EU Joint Parliamentary Assembly. She is also a member of the European Parliament Intergroup on Climate Change, Biodiversity and Sustainable Development, the European Parliament Intergroup on Small and Medium-Sized Enterprises (SMEs), the European Parliament Intergroup on LGBT Rights and the MEP Interest Group on Obesity & Health System Resilience.

Political positions
Weiss has described her priorities in the parliament to be to strengthen the European Union's energy, and climate policy, and controls on immigration.

Personal life
Weiss has been married twice and has three children.

References

1968 births
Living people
MEPs for Denmark 2019–2024
21st-century women MEPs for Denmark
University of Southern Denmark alumni
Copenhagen Business School alumni
Conservative People's Party (Denmark) MEPs
People from Middelfart Municipality
Local politicians in Denmark